Eric Williamson may refer to:

Eryk Williamson (born 1997), American soccer player
Eric Miles Williamson (born 1961), American novelist and literary critic

See also
Eric Williams (disambiguation)